Léon Krier CVO (born 7 April 1946) is a Luxembourgish architect, architectural theorist, and urban planner, a prominent critic of modernist architecture and advocate of New Classical architecture and New Urbanism. Krier combines an international architecture and planning practice with writing and teaching. He is well-known for his master plan for Poundbury, in Dorset, England.  He is the younger brother of architect Rob Krier.

Biography 

Krier abandoned his architectural studies at the University of Stuttgart, Germany, in 1968, after only one year, to work in the office of architect James Stirling in London, UK. After four years working for Stirling, interrupted by a two-year association with Josef Paul Kleihues in Berlin, Krier spent 20 years in England practicing and teaching at the Architectural Association and Royal College of Art. In this period, Krier's statement: “I am an architect, because I don’t build”, became a famous expression of his uncompromising anti-modernist attitude. From the late 1970s onwards he has been one of the most influential modern traditional architects and planners. He is one of the first and most prominent critics of architectural modernism, mainly of its functional zoning and the ensuing suburbanism, campaigning for the renaissance of the traditional grown city model and its growth based on the polycentric city model.

His ideas had a great influence on the New Urbanism movement, both in the USA and Europe. The most complete compilation of them is published in his book The Architecture of Community.

He is best known for his masterplan for, and ongoing oversight of, the development of Poundbury, an urban extension to Dorchester, UK for the Duchy of Cornwall and Charles III; and for his masterplan for Paseo Cayalá, an extension of four new urban quarters for Guatemala City. From 1976–2016 Krier was a visiting professor at the Universities of Princeton, Yale, Virginia, Cornell and Notre Dame. From 1987–90 Krier was the first director of the SOMAI, the Skidmore, Owings & Merrill Architectural Institute, in Chicago. Since 1990, Krier has been industrial designer for Valli e Valli - Assa Abloy and Giorgetti, an Italian furniture company. In 2003 Krier became the inaugural Driehaus Architecture Prize laureate. 

Krier acts as architectural consultant on his urban planning projects but only designs buildings of his personal choice. Amongst his best known realizations are the temporary façade at the 1980 Venice Biennale; the Krier house in the resort village of Seaside, Florida, USA (where he also advised on the masterplan); the Archaeological Museum of São Miguel de Odrinhas, Portugal; the Windsor Village Hall in Florida; the Jorge M. Perez Architecture Center, the University of Miami School of Architecture in Miami, Florida; and the new Neighbourhood Center Città Nuova in Alessandria, Italy. 

Though Krier is well known for his defense of classical architecture and the reconstruction of traditional “European city” models, close scrutiny of his work in fact shows a shift from an early Modernist rationalist approach (project for University of Bielefeld, 1968) towards a vernacular and classical approach both formally and technologically. The project that marked a major turning point in his campaigning attitude towards the reconstruction of the traditional European city was his scheme (unrealized) for the 'reconstruction' of his home city of Luxembourg (1978), in response to the modernist redevelopment of the city. He later master planned Luxembourg's new Cité Judiciaire that was to be architecturally designed by his brother (1990–2008). 

In 1990, of the nine experts invited, he was the only one to support the Dresden citizens' initiative to reconstruct the historic Dresden Frauenkirche and the Historische Neumarkt area and, in 2007, the Frankfurt Altstadt Forum, a citizen initiative which succeeded in reconstructing the historic "Hühnermarkt" area against strong professional and political opposition.

Krier has applied his theories in large-scale, detailed plans for numerous cities in the Western world. These include the unrealized schemes for Kingston upon Hull (1977), Rome (1977), Luxembourg (1978) (which was his most comprehensive masterplan focusing on sprawl mitigation and town center repair), West Berlin (1977–83), Bremen (1978–1980), Stockholm (1981), Poing Nord, Munich (1983), a masterplan to be completed in the year 2000 for Washington D.C. (1984) commissioned by the Museum of Modern Art of New York; Atlantis, a neoclassical district for intellectuals and artists on Tenerife (1987); Area Fiat, Novoli (Florence), Italy (1993), Corbeanca, Romania (2007), and the High Malton Masterplan for the Fitzwilliam Estate, Yorkshire, England (2014).

Krier has designed plans commissioned by public administrations, including the redevelopment of Tor Bella Monaca, a degraded suburb of Rome (2010), and a long-term redevelopment policy plan for the municipal area of Cattolica, Rimini, Italy (2017); he was able to apply similar principles to built developments such as Knokke, Heulebrug, Belgium (1998), completed without his direction; and in his masterplan for Newquay growth area (2002-2006), Cornwall, UK, continued after his resignation by Adam Associates.

, Krier is designing plans for Poundbury Dorset, U.K. (1988–present); Paseo Cayalá, Guatemala City (2003–present); El Socorro and Nogales, two new urban quarters for Guatemala City (2018–present); and the redevelopment of the closed Fawley Waterside Power Station, Southampton, U.K. (2017–present), which gained outline planning permission in July 2020, with construction beginning in 2022 and the first homes expected to be available by 2024; as well as the masterplan for a new town, Herencia de Allende, near San Miguel de Allende, México (2018–present).

The size of the city
Krier agreed with the viewpoint of the late Heinrich Tessenow that there is a strict relationship between the economic and cultural wealth of a city, on the one hand, and the limitation of its population on the other. But this is not a matter of mere hypothesis, he argues, but historical fact. The measurements and geometric organization of a city and of its quarters are not the result of mere chance or accident or simply of economic necessity, but rather represents a civilizing order which is not only aesthetic and technical but also legislative and ethical.

Krier claims, that “the whole of Paris is a pre-industrial city which still works, because it is so adaptable, something the creations of the 20th century will never be. A city like Milton Keynes cannot survive an economic crisis, or any other kind of crisis, because it is planned as a mathematically determined social and economic project. If that model collapses, the city will collapse with it.” Thus Krier argues not merely against the contemporary modernist city (he in fact argues that places like Los Angeles, US, are not cities), but against a gigantism tendency in urban growth, evident in the exploding scale of urban networks and buildings in European cities throughout the 19th century which was a result of the concentration of economic, political and cultural power. In response to this, Krier proposed the reconstruction of the European city, based on polycentric settlement models which are dictated not by machine scale but by human scale both horizontally and vertically, of self-sufficient mixed use quarters not exceeding  (able to be crossed in 10 minutes walk) of building heights of 3 to 5 floors or 100 steps (able to be walked up comfortably) and which are limited not by mere administrative borders but by walkable, ridable, drivable boulevards, tracks, park ways. Cities then grow by the multiplication of independent urban quarters, not by horizontal or vertical over-extensions of established urban cores.

On the development of the city 
Krier has written a number of essays − many first published in the journal Architectural Design, against modernist town planning and its principle of dividing up the city into a system of single use zones (housing, shopping, industry, leisure, etc.), as well as the resultant suburbia, commuting, etc. Indeed, Krier sees the modernist planner as a tyrannical figure that imposes detrimental megastructural scale more dictated by ideology than necessity.

Krier summons up his criticisms and pinpoints concepts in the form of series of drawings and didactic annotated diagrams, often in his own handwriting, eventually collected in his book Drawings for Architecture, like the concept of Urban in his 1983 diagram of a truly urban town= RES PUBLICA+RES PRIVATE. There he conceives the basic urban fabric, made of private buildings and uses, as an object of vernacular local design and the exceptional public and institutional buildings as objects of classical architecture and located in privileged sites, on squares and in the focus of major vistas.

On architecture and the city 
The principle behind Krier’s writings has been to explain the rational foundations of architecture and the city, stating that “In the language of symbols, there can exist no misunderstanding”. That is to say, for Krier, buildings have a rational order and type: a house, a palace, a temple, a campanile, a church; but also a roof, a column, a window, etc., what he terms “nameable objects”. As projects get bigger, he goes on to argue, the buildings should not get bigger, but divide up; thus, for instance, in his unrealized scheme for a school in Saint-Quentin-en-Yvelines (1978), France, the school became a “city in miniature”. 

Krier proposes functional programs greatly varied within each block and plot. For him the building’s design should always be typologically or tectonically justified and the variety of building types and volumes should reflect this functional variety in an evident and natural way; in short all gratuitous uniformity or gratuitous variety should be avoided designing neighboring building lots of dimensional, functional and thus formal variety and in such a way as to generate networks of public spaces consisting of public streets, squares, avenues, boulevards, parks. For Krier it is essential to compose at once the harmony of the urban blocks and of the inseparable public spaces generated between them.

In searching for such a typological architecture, Krier’s work has been termed “an architecture without a style”. However, it has also been pointed out that the appearance of his architecture is very much like Roman architecture, which he then places in all his projects, be it central London, Stockholm, Tenerife or Florida.”
He has defended the architecture of Hitler cabinet minister Albert Speer, distinguishing his work from the regime he served.

A selection of manifesto texts by Krier
Many of these are available online

The idea of reconstruction
Critique of zoning
Town and country
Critique of the megastructural city
Critique of industrialization
Urban components
The city within the city – Les Quartiers
The size of a city
Critique of Modernisms
Organic versus mechanical composition
Names and nicknames
Building and architecture
The reconstruction of the European city
What is an urban quartier? Form and legislation

Selected publications
James Stirling: buildings & projects 1950-1974, Stuttgart, Gerd Hatje, 1975
Rational Architecture Rationelle, Bruxelles, AAM Editions, 1978.
Léon Krier. Houses, Palaces, Cities. Edited by Demetri Porphyrios, Architectural Design, 54 7/8, 1984.
Léon Krier Drawings 1967-1980, Bruxelles, AAM Editions, 1981.
Albert Speer, Architecture 1932-1942, Bruxelles, AAM Editions, 1985. New York, Monacelli Press, 2013.
Léon Krier: Architecture & Urban Design 1967-1992, London, Academy Editions, 1992.
Architecture: Choice or Fate, London, Andreas Papadakis Publishers, 1998.
Get Your House Right, Architectural Elements to Use & Avoid, New York,     Sterling Publishing, 2007 
The Architectural Tuning of Settlements, London, The Prince’s Foundation, 2008
Drawing for Architecture, Cambridge (Massachusetts), MIT Press, 2009.
The Architecture of Community, Washington DC, Island Press, 2009.
 Léon Krier: selected publications available online Leon Krier -- Selected Publications.

References

External links

2001 interview on New Urbanism
 on the Driehaus Prize, feat. Léon Krier
Article 'Cities for Living' by Roger Scruton at city-journal.org

New Classical architects
Academics of the Royal College of Art
1946 births
Living people
People from Luxembourg City
Urban theorists
Luxembourgian urban planners
New Urbanism
Driehaus Architecture Prize winners
21st-century Luxembourgian architects